Labeobarbus ruandae is a species of ray-finned fish in the family Cyprinidae. It is found only in Rwanda. Its natural habitat is rivers. It is threatened by habitat loss.

References

ruandae
Fish described in 1914
Taxonomy articles created by Polbot
Taxobox binomials not recognized by IUCN